Activekammen is a mountain ridge in Wedel Jarlsberg Land at Spitsbergen, Svalbard. It has a length of about three kilometers, and the highest peak is 634 m.a.s.l. It is located between Vestervågen and the glacier Renardbreen. The ridge is named after the British vessel Active.

References

Mountains of Spitsbergen